El patio de Tlaquepaque is a Mexican telenovela produced by Ernesto Alonso for Telesistema Mexicano in 1966.

Cast 
Susana Freyre
Miguel Manzano
Aarón Hernán
Blanca Torres
Felipe Santander
Betty Catania
Carlos Bracho
Marina Marín

References

External links 

Mexican telenovelas
1966 telenovelas
Televisa telenovelas
Spanish-language telenovelas
1966 Mexican television series debuts
1966 Mexican television series endings